Lassaba acribomena is a moth of the family Geometridae first described by Louis Beethoven Prout in 1928. It is found in Sumatra, Peninsular Malaysia, Borneo and possibly the Philippines.

External links

Moths of Asia

Boarmiini